Leonardville is a city in Riley County, Kansas, United States.  As of the 2020 census, the population of the city was 432.

History
Leonardville was established in 1881. It was named for Leonard T. Smith, a railroad official. A post office has been in operation at Leonardville since 1882.

Geography
Leonardville is located at  (39.363273, -96.859571).

Demographics

Leonardville is part of the Manhattan, Kansas Metropolitan Statistical Area.

2010 census
As of the census of 2010, there were 449 people, 169 households, and 112 families residing in the city. The racial makeup of the city was 96.7% White, 0.7% African American, 0.2% Native American, 0.4% from other races, and 2.0% from two or more races. Hispanic or Latino of any race were 4.5% of the population.

There were 169 households, of which 36.1% had children under the age of 18 living with them, 50.3% were married couples living together, 11.2% had a female householder with no husband present, 4.7% had a male householder with no wife present, and 33.7% were non-families. 29.6% of all households were made up of individuals, and 11.9% had someone living alone who was 65 years of age or older. The average household size was 2.37 and the average family size was 2.91.

The median age in the city was 43.4 years. 24.3% of residents were under the age of 18; 3.5% were between the ages of 18 and 24; 25.2% were from 25 to 44; 23.9% were from 45 to 64; and 23.2% were 65 years of age or older. The gender makeup of the city was 45.2% male and 54.8% female.

2000 census
As of the census of 2000, there were 398 people, 167 households, and 114 families residing in the city. The racial makeup of the city was 98.74% White, 0.25% Native American, 0.50% Asian, and 0.50% from two or more races. Hispanic or Latino of any race were 0.50% of the population.

There were 167 households, out of which 29.9% had children under the age of 18 living with them, 58.1% were married couples living together, 8.4% had a female householder with no husband present, and 31.7% were non-families. 27.5% of all households were made up of individuals, and 13.8% had someone living alone who was 65 years of age or older. The average household size was 2.38 and the average family size was 2.91.

In the city, the population was spread out, with 26.4% under the age of 18, 4.8% from 18 to 24, 28.6% from 25 to 44, 18.3% from 45 to 64, and 21.9% who were 65 years of age or older. The median age was 39 years. For every 100 females, there were 96.1 males. For every 100 females age 18 and over, there were 91.5 males.

The median income for a household in the city was $31,875, and the median income for a family was $38,750. Males had a median income of $26,250 versus $20,469 for females. The per capita income for the city was $16,327. About 4.2% of families and 9.0% of the population were below the poverty line, including 9.4% of those under age 18 and 4.7% of those age 65 or over.

Education
The community is served by Riley County USD 378 public school district.

Notable people
 Quentin Breese (1918–1962), boxer
 Albin Longren (1882–1950), aviation pioneer
 Jordy Nelson (b. 1985), former American football player for the Green Bay Packers

References

External links
 City of Leonardville
 Leonardville – Directory of Public Officials
 Leonardville city map, KDOT

Cities in Kansas
Cities in Riley County, Kansas
Manhattan, Kansas metropolitan area